"Stand Up", officially titled "Stand Up (from Harriet)", is a song performed by English singer Cynthia Erivo and co-written by Erivo with Joshuah Brian Campbell. It was released on 25 October 2019, as the lead single from the soundtrack to the biographical film Harriet, which also stars Erivo.

Background and composition
In 2017, English singer and actress Cynthia Erivo was cast to portray abolitionist and activist Harriet Tubman in the biographical film eponymously titled Harriet. Following the completion of filming, Erivo collaborated with composer Joshuah Brian Campbell to write the song for the end credits of the film. 

Written by Erivo and Campbell, "Stand Up" was produced by Will Wells and Gabe Fox-Peck. The song was described by Rolling Stones Jon Blistein as a "slow-burning, gospel-tinged ballad." Rania Aniftos of Billboard noted that it chronicles themes of "hope, overcoming obstacles and kindness for others." The song's lyrics also make use of Tubman's last words before her death in 1913: "I go to prepare a place for you."

Music video
The music video for "Stand Up" was released on 8 November 2019. It shows Erivo performing the song on an "empty but beautifully lit soundstage."

Accolades
Following its release, the song earned Golden Globe Award and Critics' Choice Movie Award nominations for Best Original Song and Best Song, respectively. It also garnered an Academy Award nomination for Best Original Song. The song was also nominated for the Best Song Written For Visual Media at the 63rd Annual Grammy Awards, the Best Original Song at the 51st NAACP Image Awards, and the Best Original Song at the 13th Houston Film Critics Society Awards. It won the Society of Composers & Lyricists Award for Outstanding Original Song for Visual Media.

Charts

Release history

References

External links

2019 singles
2019 songs
2010s ballads
Back Lot Music singles
Cynthia Erivo songs
Songs written by Cynthia Erivo
Songs written for films